Cosmopolitan (known as Nova from 1973 to 2015) was a Brazilian monthly women's magazine published by Abril and part of the international Cosmopolitan group.

History and profile
The magazine was started by Editora Abril in 1973. It was formerly called Nova. The editorial content was based on: love/sex, life/work, famous people, beauty/health and fashion/style. In August 2018 the magazine ceased publication.

References

1973 establishments in Brazil
2018 disestablishments in Brazil
Magazines published in Brazil
Monthly magazines published in Brazil
Defunct magazines published in Brazil
Grupo Abril
Magazines established in 1973
Magazines disestablished in 2018
Portuguese-language magazines
Women's magazines
Cosmopolitan (magazine)
History of women in Brazil